Airfield "Kalyniv" - airfield in Ukraine, located about  northeast of Kalyniv and  northeast of Sambir, near the Polish border.

Notes
Carpathian military district's USSR air force

Soviet Air Force bases
Ukrainian airbases